Damirchi-ye Olya (also Romanized as Damīrchī-ye ‘Olyā; also known as Damīr Chelū, Damīrchelū-ye ‘Olyā, Damirchilu, Damīrchī-ye Bālā, and Damīr Cholū) is a village in Ojarud-e Sharqi Rural District, Muran District, Germi County, Ardabil Province, Iran. At the 2006 census, its population was 78, in 14 families.

References 

Towns and villages in Germi County